Aunt Rachel is a 1920 British silent drama film directed by Albert Ward and starring Isobel Elsom, Haidee Wright and James Lindsay. The standard of the film's intertitles was criticised.

Cast
 Isobel Elsom as Ruth 
 Haidee Wright as Aunt Rachel 
 James Lindsay as Ferdinand de Blacquaire 
 Lionelle Howard as Reuben 
 Tom Reynolds as Eld 
 Dalton Somers as Fuller 
 Leonard Pagden as Ezra Gold 
 Herbert Willis as Earl 
 Dan Godfrey as Isiah

References

Bibliography
 Bamford, Kentom. Distorted Images: British National Identity and Film in the 1920s. I.B. Tauris, 1999.
 Low, Rachael. History of the British Film, 1918–1929. George Allen & Unwin, 1971.

External links

1920 films
1920 drama films
British drama films
British silent feature films
Films directed by Albert Ward
Films based on British novels
Films set in England
British black-and-white films
1920s English-language films
1920s British films
Silent drama films